The 2012–13 Athletic Bilbao season was the 82nd consecutive season in the top flight and 112th season overall. Athletic were looking to continue their ascendency from last season where they made the final in two different competitions.

Athletic Bilbao competed for their ninth La Liga title and also participated in the UEFA Europa League, entering in the third qualifying round due to their defeat to Barcelona in the 2012 Copa del Rey Final, who had already qualified for European competition.  They also entered the Copa del Rey in the Round of 32.

Squad
The numbers and stats are established according to the official website: www.athletic-club.net

Competitions

Friendlies
Kickoff times are in CET.

La Liga

League table

Matches
Kickoff times are in CET.

Copa del Rey

Kickoff times are in CET.

UEFA Europa League

Kickoff times are in CET.

Qualifying round

Group stage

Kickoff times are in CET.

Transfers

In

Out

Loan out

References

Athletic Bilbao
Athletic Bilbao seasons
Athletic Bilbao